Darci Miguel Monteiro (26 September 1968 – 3 January 2018), also known as Darci, was a Brazilian professional footballer who played as a striker for several clubs in Brazil, Europe, and Asia, including Fluminense, CF Os Belenenses, Antalyaspor, and Widzew Łódź.

References

External links
 
 

1968 births
2018 deaths
People from Volta Redonda
Brazilian footballers
Association football forwards
Volta Redonda FC players
C.F. Os Belenenses players
Rochester New York FC players
F.C. Felgueiras players
Olaria Atlético Clube players
Ittihad FC players
Antalyaspor footballers
Fluminense FC players
Fortaleza Esporte Clube players
Widzew Łódź players
Sabah F.C. (Malaysia) players
Paniliakos F.C. players
Al Rayyan SC Beirut players
Aragua FC players
Saudi Professional League players
Lebanese Premier League players
Brazilian expatriate footballers
Expatriate soccer players in the United States
Expatriate footballers in Portugal
Expatriate footballers in Saudi Arabia
Expatriate footballers in Turkey
Expatriate footballers in Poland
Expatriate footballers in Malaysia
Expatriate footballers in Greece
Expatriate footballers in Lebanon
Expatriate footballers in Venezuela
Brazilian expatriate sportspeople in the United States
Brazilian expatriate sportspeople in Portugal
Brazilian expatriate sportspeople in Saudi Arabia
Brazilian expatriate sportspeople in Turkey
Brazilian expatriate sportspeople in Poland
Brazilian expatriate sportspeople in Malaysia
Brazilian expatriate sportspeople in Greece
Brazilian expatriate sportspeople in Lebanon
Brazilian expatriate sportspeople in Venezuela
Sportspeople from Rio de Janeiro (state)